Sri Aurobindo Memorial School is a school in Bengaluru, India. It was established in 1962 and today is located in the Banashankari locality of south Bangalore.

Curriculum
Sri Aurobindo Memorial School offers CBSE curriculum from the 1st to the 10th grade. It used to offer the Karnataka Secondary Education Examination Board SSLC curriculum from the 8th grade, but after the Covid-19 Pandemic, has switched to a pure CBSE curriculum. It also offers nursery, lower and upper kindergarten education.

History
What is now called the Sri Aurobindo Memorial School (SAMS) was founded in 1962 and has undergone many alterations to reach its present state.  It began as "The New School" in January 1962 and soon after changed to "The New English School".  The New School, and its immediate successor, The New English School, was initially located in multiple locations in-and-around the residential locality of Jayanagar. Some locations include Ashoka Pillar, close to Lalbagh in Jayanagar 1st Block, as well as multiple buildings in Jayanagar 4th Block.

The original founders of the school in early 1962 were Mr Nathaniel and his wife, Mrs Espoir Pearson, devotees of the Mother (Mirra Alfassa) and Sri Aurobindo, and the school received the Mother's blessings upon its foundation. Mrs Espoir Pearson was the founding principal of the school, and Nathaniel Pearson was its director of studies. It was originally a primary school, having classes up to Standard 7 until the early 1970s when the Pearsons' left Bangalore for Australia. The principal objective of the school was that it should be an English Medium School with the language of instruction being English for all subjects taught. The Pearsons had a vision for excellence in English learning and teaching in Bangalore, and they saw a need for a good quality English school in what was then the new settlement of Jayanagar.

Between 1964 and 1966, the Pearsons took leave without pay from the school to live briefly in the United Kingdom, and in order to ensure the continuity of the School, Espoir Pearson's father, Dr. Santoshananda, was invited to manage the day-to-day running of the School as interim principal. It was following this invitation that Dr Santoshananda and his wife, Mrs Sushila Santosh came to Bangalore, which was towards the end of 1964, by which time The New English School was reasonably well established with about 150-200 students.  Contrary to the SAMS website, neither Dr Santoshananda nor his wife, founded The New School in 1962.  They were not residing in Bangalore at that time since Dr Santoshananda was in Muzaffarnagar while Mrs Sushila Santosh was living in Pondicherry; indeed, it's almost inconceivable that Mrs Sushila Santosh helped found an English medium school, since she was not fluent in English.  Upon their return from the UK, Espoir Pearson resumed her duties as school principal, while Nathaniel Pearson assisted in curriculum development and teaching English to students, and his wife's younger sister, Ms Shashi Kanta Sharma assisted with various teaching duties. Early teachers at the New School/New English School included Mr. Balakrishnan and Ms Shanta Issac.

Following the Pearsons' departure to Australia in early 1971, Espoir Pearson's younger brother, Sri Kumar Vasishtha, was appointed principal of the school. Sri Kumar managed the school until 1975, following which his younger brother, Raj Vasishtha, was appointed administrator and his younger sister, Aditi Vasishtha, was appointed principal. Shortly after these appointments were made, the name of the school was changed again, this time to the 'Sri Aurobindo Memorial School', its present name.  Mr. Raj Vasishtha passed away on the 5th of December 2022.

Prayer
The school emphasises prayer and meditation. School days start and end with prayer. The morning prayer is Sri Aurobindo's Gayatri Mantra. It is different from the Gayatri Mantra of the Rigveda. In the middle school, different morning prayers are sung on different days of the week. A lunch prayer, "Annapurna Sadaapurne", is sung before the students go for lunch and all the students sing a "Thank You God" prayer at the end of the school day. In the evenings, "Make of us the hero warriors" is sung.

There is a meditation hall in the first floor of the Harmony Building to encourage serenity and devotion. In the center of this room lie the relics of Sri Aurobindo, brought to the school on relics day from the Pondicherry Ashram by Aditi and Raj Vasishtha in August 1997. The Relics are said to be a silver lock and some nails of Sri Aurobindo's which are contained in a silver casket enclosed by a sandalwood box, housed in a marble shrine.

Sports facilities
The school has a vast playground. Events in athletics, shuttle, basketball, volleyball, table tennis, kho kho, throwball, chess, carrom, cricket, football, tennis and netball are held annually. The school conducts karate and chess classes for students from classes 2 to 8 every morning. It also sends students to compete with other schools in activities including chess and badminton.

Extracurricular activities
The school hosts events such as debates, speech contests in English and Hindi, science and social science seminars, and recitations annually. Intra-section competitions are conducted on recitation, impromptu speeches and handwriting skills. Students are also sent for debates, quizzes, speeches, dance and music competitions. Annually students are asked to participate in the Independence Day program or Talent's Day program conducted for classes from pre nursery to 10th Grade.

References

Private schools in Bangalore
Schools affiliated with the Sri Aurobindo Ashram
1962 establishments in Mysore State
Educational institutions established in 1962